Suze Slager-Velsen (1883-1964) was a Dutch painter.

Biography
Slager-Velsen née Velsen was born on 6 November 1883 in Oostburg. She studied at the Academie voor Beeldende Kunsten (Academy of Visual Arts) in Rotterdam. Her teachers included , Dirk Herman Michaël Harting. She was married to fellow artist  (1871-1938) with whom she had one child. Her work was included in the 1939 exhibition and sale Onze Kunst van Heden (Our Art of Today) at the Rijksmuseum in Amsterdam.

Slager-Velsen died on 25 December 1964 in 's-Hertogenbosch.

Legacy
Suze Bergé-Slager, Slager-Velsen's daughter, established the Museum Slager in 's-Hertogenbosch. The museum houses works of several generations of Slagers.

References

1883 births
1964 deaths
20th-century Dutch women artists